O. uniformis may refer to:
 Oedipina uniformis, a salamander species found in Costa Rica and possibly Panama
 Ophiacodon uniformis, a large pelycosaur fossil species found in Joggins, Nova Scotia and Canada

See also
 Uniformis